This is a list of fellows of the Royal Society elected in 1718.

Fellows
 John Bamber (c. 1667–1753)
 Thomas Bates (d. c. 1760)
 William Beckett (1684–1738)
 James Bradley (1693–1762)
 Thomas Bury (1655–1722)
 Charles Cadogan, 2nd Baron Cadogan (1685–1776)
 James Campbell (d. 1733)
 John Conduitt (1688–1737)
 Caleb Cotesworth (d. 1741)
 Samuel Cruwys (d. 1747)
 Robert Gay (d. 1738)
 Stephen Hales (?1677–1761)
 John Hollier (c. 1687–c. 1722)
 Antoine de Jussieu (1686–1758)
 Thomas Fantet de Lagny (1660–?1734)
 Sir Wilfrid Lawson, 3rd Baronet, of Isell (1697–1737)
 John Heinrich Linck (1674–1734)
 Pietro Antonio Michelotti (1680–1740)
 James Mickleton (fl. 1718)
 John Montagu, 2nd Duke of Montagu (1690–1749)
 Ludovicus a Ripa (d. 1746)
 Nicholas Saunderson (1682–1739)
 William Stephens (c. 1693–1760)
 William Stukeley (1687–1765)
 William Wagstaffe (1685–1725)
 Robert Welsted (1671–1735)
 John Whiteside (?1679–?1729)

References

1718
1718 in science
1718 in England